The 1980 Miami Hurricanes football team represented the University of Miami as an independent during the 1980 NCAA Division I-A football season. Led by second-year head coach Howard Schnellenberger, the Hurricanes played their home games at the Miami Orange Bowl in Miami, Florida. Miami finished the season with a record of 9–3. They were invited to the Peach Bowl, where they defeated Virginia Tech, 20–10.

Schedule

Season summary

Louisville

Florida State

Source:

Florida

Jim Kelly threw for two touchdowns and halfbacks Mark Rush and Smokey Roan each ran for one as Miami upset Florida on their way to a Peach Bowl berth.  Dan Miller had attempted a field goal as time expired with one official signaling the kick was good, while the other did not.  Both teams left the field with the score 28-7 before minutes later it was changed to 31-7 as it was explained the official that appeared to wave the kick "no good" was signaling that the clock had run out.

Roster

Team players drafted into the NFL

References

Miami
Miami Hurricanes football seasons
Peach Bowl champion seasons
Miami Hurricanes football